Heather McPherson  (born May 9, 1972) is a Canadian politician who was elected to represent the riding of Edmonton Strathcona in the House of Commons of Canada in the 2019 Canadian federal election. She previously served as executive director of the Alberta Council on Global Co-operation.

McPherson is the daughter of Duke and Marilyn McPherson and was born and raised in Edmonton. She attended the University of Alberta where she earned an undergraduate and master's degree in education. McPherson became the candidate for Edmonton Strathcona after incumbent Linda Duncan announced her intentions to retire. Straying from the party leadership's position, she supported the Trans Mountain pipeline expansion project. In the 43rd Canadian Parliament, which lasted from 2019 until the 2021 Canadian federal election was called, she was the only non-Conservative MP from Alberta. She was re-elected in 2021, and was appointed the NDP critic for Foreign Affairs in the 44th Canadian Parliament.

Electoral record

References

External links

Living people
Members of the House of Commons of Canada from Alberta
New Democratic Party MPs
Politicians from Edmonton
Women members of the House of Commons of Canada
1972 births